The Consumer Price Index (CPI) is the official measure of inflation of consumer prices of the United Kingdom.  It is also called the Harmonised Index of Consumer Prices (HICP).

History

The traditional measure of inflation in the UK for many years was the Retail Prices Index (RPI), which was first calculated in the early 20th century to evaluate the extent to which workers were affected by price changes during the First World War. The main index was described as the Interim Index of Retail Prices from 1947 to 1955. In January 1956, it was rebased and renamed the Index of Retail Prices. In January 1962 this was replaced by the General Index of Retail Prices, which was again rebased at that time. A further rebasing occurred in January 1987, subsequent to the issue of the first index-linked gilts.

RPIX
An explicit inflation target was first set in October 1992 by Chancellor of the Exchequer Norman Lamont, following the UK's departure from the Exchange Rate Mechanism. Initially, the target was based on the RPIX, which is the RPI calculated excluding mortgage interest payments. This was felt to be a better measure of the effectiveness of macroeconomic policy. It was argued that if interest rates are used to curb inflation, then including mortgage payments in the inflation measure would be misleading. Until 1997, interest rates were set by the Treasury.

Introducing CPI 

On election in May 1997, the new Labour government handed control over interest rates to the politically independent Bank of England Monetary Policy Committee. This committee is given the responsibility of adjusting interest rates in order to meet an inflation target set by the Chancellor. The initial target rate of inflation was an RPIX of 2.5%. The committee meets once per month to decide if any changes to the interest rate are necessary. If, in any month, inflation deviates from the target by more than one percentage point, the Governor of the Bank of England is required to write an open letter to the Chancellor explaining the reasons for this and to propose a plan of action for bringing inflation back towards the target.

Since 1996, the United Kingdom has also tracked a Consumer Price Index figure, and in December 2003, the inflation target was changed to CPI of 2%, from the previous target of RPIX of 2.5%.

CPIH
The Consumer Prices Index including owner occupiers' housing costs (CPIH) became the lead inflation index in UK official inflation statistics on 21 March 2017.

Implementation

The CPI calculates the average price increase as a percentage for a basket of 700 different goods and services. Around the middle of each month it collects information on prices of these commodities from 120,000 different retailing outlets. Note that unlike the RPI, the CPI takes the geometric mean of prices to aggregate items at the lowest levels, instead of the arithmetic mean. This means that the CPI will generally be lower than the RPI. The rationale is that this accounts for the fact that consumers will buy less of something if its price goes up, and more if its price goes down; it also ensures that if prices go up and then revert to the previous level, the CPI also reverts to its previous level (which is not the case with the calculation method used for the RPI). According to the ONS, this difference in averaging method is the largest contributing factor to the differences between the RPI and the CPI.

The change in the CPI over the 12 months to August 2008 was 4.7%, while the corresponding figure for RPIX (which excludes mortgage interest) was 5.2% and that for RPI (which includes mortgage interest) was 4.8%. The CPI, the RPIX, and the RPI are published monthly by the Office for National Statistics (ONS). A history of CPI and RPIX going back to 1989 can be found at the ONS' website.

There has been criticism of CPI as being a less effective measure of price rises than the Retail Prices Index, accusing it of being easier to manipulate and less broad based (for example excluding housing). John Redwood, the Conservative MP, has said that CPI targeting meant that interest rates were set lower at a time of rising (RPI) inflation.

Nevertheless, following the UK general election of May 2010 the incoming Conservative Chancellor George Osborne announced that CPI was to be more widely adopted, including for setting benefits and pensions.

In January 2013 the Office for National Statistics announced its conclusion that the RPI did not meet international standards and it is no longer formally ranked as a UK 'National Statistic'.

CPI and culture 
The basket of goods and services chosen is intended to reflect changes in society's buying habits. For example, on 23 March 2009, rosé wine and takeaway chicken were added to the basket, whereas volume bottled cider and boxes of wine were removed.

See also
 Pollyanna Creep
 1976 sterling crisis
 2021–present United Kingdom cost of living crisis

References

External links
 National Statistics
 Bank of England's inflation calculator

Price indices
Office for National Statistics
1947 introductions
Inflation in the United Kingdom